Mendiants et orgueilleux is a 1971 French film. It stars actor Gabriele Ferzetti.

References

External links

1971 films
French crime comedy-drama films
1970s French-language films
Films directed by Jacques Poitrenaud
1970s French films